"Things Bad Begun" is the fifteenth and penultimate episode of the third season of the post-apocalyptic horror television series Fear the Walking Dead, which aired on AMC on October 15, 2017 along with the season finale; "Sleigh Ride". This episode features the death of Troy Otto (Daniel Sharman) as he's killed by Madison Clark (Kim Dickens).

Plot 
Alicia brings Diana to the bazaar for treatment and is enlisted to assist a life-saving operation. The patient is John, the President of the Proctors, an outlaw motorcycle gang which is opening a trade route from the Texas gulf coast to San Diego. Troy learns that the Proctors intend to attack the dam and rushes with Nick to warn them. The staff at the dam decide to hold out but if defeat is certain to blow the dam with explosives to deny the Proctors a water monopoly. Walker and Crazy Dog leave to search for survivors from their nation. Strand tells Nick to get his family out, having made a deal with the Proctors and no longer being able to guarantee anyone's safety. Nick is questioned by Daniel about the herd, giving Nick another reason to get them out. When Madison learns that Troy led the herd, she murders him in front of Nick. Strand opens a gate for the Proctors and in a struggle shoots Daniel in the face. As the Proctors overrun the dam, Strand takes the detonator and hides Madison and Nick.

Reception 

In a joint review along with the season finale episode, "Sleigh Ride", Matt Fowler of IGN gave "Things Bad Begun" an 8/10 rating, stating; "Some of the interpersonal moments didn't quite feel right in Fear the Walking Dead's Season 3 close-out, but using the dam as the centerpiece for the endgame, while also introducing a new villain into the mix, made for an exciting finale - even if Madison's haunting dreams were the only thing that resonated emotionally."

Conversely, David S.E Zapanta of Den of Geek gave "Things Bad Begun" a more negative review, with a 2.5/5 rating, stating; "As dynamic and engaging as Ray McKinnon is, he and his underdeveloped proctors felt shoehorned into the end of the season."

Ratings 
"Things Bad Begun" was seen by 2.23 million viewers in the United States on its original air date, the same amount of ratings as the previous episodes.

References

2017 American television episodes
Fear the Walking Dead (season 3) episodes